Barlow House may refer to:

in the United States
(by state then town)
Barlow Apartments, Little Rock, Arkansas, listed on the National Register of Historic Places (NRHP)
Boce W. Barlow, Jr., House, Hartford, Connecticut, NRHP-listed in Hartford, Connecticut 
Aaron Barlow House, Redding Connecticut, NRHP-listed in Fairfield County
Barlow House (Barlow, Kentucky), NRHP-listed in Kentucky
Barlow House (Lancaster, Kentucky), NRHP-listed in Garrard County
Gregory-Barlow Place, Mooresville, Kentucky, NRHP-listed in Washington County
William V. N. Barlow House, Albion, New York, listed on the NRHP in Orleans County
Smith H. Barlow House, Lacona, New York, listed on the NRHP
William Barlow House, Canby, Oregon, listed on the NRHP
 William Barlow House, Barlow, Oregon, listed on the NRHP
Barlow Building, Bellingham, Washington, NRHP-listed in Whatcom County